Chhaya Verma is an Indian politician from the state of Chhattisgarh and belongs to the Indian National Congress. She is currently the State Congress Secretary.

In June 2016, she was announced as the party's candidate for the Rajya Sabha biennial polls. On 3 June 2016 she was elected unopposed.

References

Rajya Sabha members from Chhattisgarh
Women in Chhattisgarh politics
Indian National Congress politicians from Chhattisgarh
20th-century Indian women politicians
20th-century Indian politicians
Women members of the Rajya Sabha
1962 births
Living people